Eugen Kölbing (1846-1899) was a German philologist, a specialist in the study of Nordic, English, and French language and literature and comparative linguistics and literature.

Academic career
Eugen Kölbing studied Philosophy, Classical Philology, Comparative Literature, German(ic) Philology, and "New" Philology at the University of Leipzig, wrote his doctoral dissertation (1868) on the Nordic versions of the legend of Parzival under the supervision of Friedrich Karl Theodor Zarncke, an eminent Germanist, and finished his post-doctoral dissertation at the University of Breslau on the Nordic versions of the Partonopeus legend (1873). He became professor at the University of Breslau. His published works covered a wide range of medieval works. He founded in 1877 the journal Englische Studien and served as its sole editor until 1899, thus making a lasting contribution to the foundational phase of English studies in Europe.

Works
Untersuchungen über den Ausfall des Relativ-Pronomens in den germanischen Sprachen (1872)
Riddarasögur, Parzevals Saga etc. (1872)
Beiträge zur vergleichenden Geschichte der romantischen Poesie und Prosa des Mittelalters (1876)
Chanson de Roland (1877)
Die nordische und englische Version der Tristansage (1878–82) 
Elis Saga ok Rosamundu (1881)
Amis und Amiloun (1884)
The Romance of Sir Beues of Hamtoun (1885) Early English Text Society
Ipomedon (1889)

References

External links
 Biography

1846 births
1899 deaths
Academic staff of the University of Breslau